HSwMS Sölve is one of seven s built for the Swedish Navy in the mid-1870s. The ship had an uneventful career and was sold in 1919 for conversion into a barge. She became a museum ship in Gothenburg, Sweden, in 1992.

Design and description
The Hildur-class monitors were designed by Lieutenant John Christian d'Ailly, from a proposal by John Ericsson, for the defense of Lake Mälaren and the Stockholm archipelago. Her crew numbered 48 officers and men. The ship had rudders at bow and stern.

The Hildurs had a pair of two-cylinder horizontal-return connecting-rod steam engines, each driving a single propeller using steam from two cylindrical boilers. The ships carried  of coal.

The monitors were equipped with one  M/69 rifled breech loader, mounted in a long, fixed, oval-shaped gun turret. The Hildurs also mounted two  guns. They were rearmed with a  quick-firing gun as well as three  quick-firing guns sometime in the 1890s or the early 1900s.

Construction and service
Sölve, named after Sölve, a semi-legendary King of Sweden, was launched in 1875 by Motala Verkstad at Norrköping. She was decommissioned in 1919 and was converted into an oil barge after she was sold. The ship was acquired by the Gothenburg Maritima Centrum from Mobiloil in 1992. It has been partially restored and is currently moored at the Maritiman marine museum in Gothenburg.

Notes

References
 
 
 

Hildur-class monitors
Ships built in Norrköping
1875 ships
Ships preserved in museums
Museum ships in Sweden
Museums in Gothenburg
1875 in Sweden